Pawan Kant Munjal (born 1954) is an Indian billionaire businessman, and the chairman, managing director and CEO of Hero MotoCorp the world’s largest manufacturer of motorcycles and scooters. India Today magazine ranked him #49th in its India's 50 Most powerful people of 2017 list.

He is the third child of Brijmohan Lall Munjal and Santosh Munjal.

As of May 2022, his net worth was estimated at US$3.4 billion.

References 

Living people
Hero Group
1954 births
Punjabi people
Indian billionaires